Villa Elisa is a city in the Central Department of Paraguay on the outskirts of Asuncion. It was the only colony that was inhabited by Swedish people in Paraguay  and today is one of the most important and active cities that are part of the Metropolitan Area of the capital. Villa Elisa is an urban city and borders with Asuncion, in the Defensores del Chaco Ave some 16 km away from Asuncion's city centre. It was founded on March 22, 1938.

History

After the Paraguayan War, Paraguay with its population devastated and poor, was receiving European immigrants, who were given land for the agricultural production and cattle breeding. Around 1890, Belgium immigrants founded the Belgium Colony of Mbocayaty, later added by French and Italian people around 1880 and 1890.

As time went by the inhabitants of the colony began to work in agricultural, specially in the production of fruit. Later the Belgium people migrated to the properties of a Danish person Emilio Johansen, and later on around 1896, the city became Colonia Elisa, as a homage to his wife, Ms Elisa Von Poleski, of an aristocratic German origin (later a street in the city will also have her name).

The first Administrative Board of Villa Elisa was created on June 21, 1899, under the direction of Mr. Emilio Johansen. To the Colonia Elisa new inhabitants arrived later: Scandinavian, Swedish, Danish and German people. With the arrival of more foreigners in the years of 1900 and 1940,the population grew and so the need of a new organization of the institutions, since Paraguay was now going through a lot of internal conflicts and the war with Bolivia, called the Chaco War (1932–1935).

Petroleum refinery operated by Petróleos Paraguayos (Petropar), an institution created by law N 1182, issued on December 23, 1985, is located in Villa Elisa. This refinery was later transformed in an autarquic company, beginning its operations on January 9, 1986.

Location

It is located only 16 km away from Asunción and to get there you must take the  South Access road. There are many public transportation and they leave Asuncion and go directly to Villa Elisa.
The city borders with the following towns: to the North with Asuncion and Fernando de la Mora, to the East with San Lorenzo and Ñemby, to the West with Lambare and to the South with San Antonio and the Paraguay River.

Demography 

It has a very high growth rate, 9.52% per year.  According to the General Direction of Statistics and Survey the population comes to a 53,166 inhabitants in 2008.  Nowadays 100% of its population corresponds to the urban area completely.

Neighborhoods 

It has 16 neighborhoods, including San Juan, Villa Bonita, Mbocayaty, Picada, Sol de América, Gloria María, Ypaty, San Miguel, Rosedal, 29 de Setiembre y 3 Bocas.

Government 

The Town Hall belongs to the first category ( Decree number 12.192/01) and the number of advisors that compose the Legislative power of the Town Hall is of twelve, and they represent to the National Republican Association, or Red Party(6), Radical Liberal Party (5) and the party Patria Querida (1). Its mayor now is Mr Ricardo Estigarribia, belonging to the Liberal Party.

Art and culture

The local party is celebrated on July 16 in the memory of Virgin of the Carmen, the patron of the city. In this occasion there are masses, a lot of delicious food, typical of Paraguay besides a number of traditional games all over the country, such as pelota tata (fire ball) toro candil, walking on fire, yvyra syi (soap stick) among others.

Some events made in the city are also: the students parades, the religious parades and the important dates, such as the Child Day, the one  in the memory of the ex soldiers who fought in the Triple Alianza War, festival of Youth in Spring day and other artistic shows that can be shared by all the family.
It was declared also the sub location of the Lake Festival of Ypacaray. It is known as the folk capital of the south.

Notable people

One of the notable people of Villa Elisa is the writer Cristian Gonzalez Safstrand, who was born in the city in 1947. Even though he was a self-taught person, he was very interested in literature from a very young age, having read some of the classics of the occidental narrative, such as the Spanish writers Miguel de Cervantes and Pedro Antonio de Alarcón, and the French Alexandre Dumas.  Gonzalez began as a narrator in 1984 with the publishing of his two short novels: Andanzas de un comisario de campaña and Sueños y conflictos. (Stories of a Country Marshal and Conflicts and Dreams). He followed these with the 1985 novel La vida y sus secuencias (1985) (Life and its Sequences) and in 1989 his fourth novel, La pesadilla (The Nightmare) was published.

Tourism

Villa Elisa is not known as a tourist city, but it has some places that are worth visiting such as the beautiful church Virgen del Carmen, the river banks where you can see beautiful landscapes and the petroleum refinery (PETROPAR) which industrial plant is located in 64 acres, on the left side of the Paraguay River

Some places of great importance and other tourist places are:

• PETROPAR Oil Refinery

• Park of the Health

• SERENITY Exotic Park

• "YO AMO VILLA ELISA" Sign (I love Villa Elisa)

• Feminine Care Center "Ciudad Mujer" (Woman City)

• Virgen del Carmen Catholic Church

• Emilio Johannsen Public School

• Reino de Suecia High School (Kingdom of Sweden)

• Villa Elisa Hospital

• Villa Elisa City Hall

• Villa Elisa Museum

• Sol de América Stadium

• Center for Promotion and Vocational Training. SNPP

• Amphitheatre of Villa Elisa (in construction)

• Paso Medín Beach

• Bus Terminal of the Line 49

Gastronomy

Villa Elisa, just like all the Paraguayan cities keeps in its gastronomic taste the typical country food such as : Mbejú, Chipa Asador, pastel mandi`o, ryguasu ka`e, lampreado, butifarra, Chicharó trenzado, Chipa so'o, among other delicious and strange specialties.

Geography

The topographic characteristics of the Central Department vary among curves of 58 to 250 meters over the sea level. Villa Elisa has a soil covered by vegetation, it's a low and sandy land. Besides it has areas only populated by trees and bushes. It's a typical savanna, a good zone for the population.

Weather

The weather is mainly tropical. The maximum temperature is in the summer and it reaches 39 degrees Celsius; the minimum in winter is 1 degree. The annual medium is of 22.

Economy 

It has many industries, commercial areas and services. Its agricultural activity is the fruit production. A great part of the population that is actively economical works in the capital of the country.

References 

 Reportaje al País. Tomo 1. Edición 2001. Asunción Paraguay.

External links
 Municipalidad de Villa Elisa

Populated places in the Central Department
Populated places established in 1890